Williamston is a town in Martin County, North Carolina, United States. The population was 5,511 at the 2010 census. It is the county seat of Martin County  and is located in North Carolina's Inner Banks region. The closest major city is Greenville, approximately 28 mi to the southwest.

History
Williamston was founded in 1779, and named after William Williams, a local military commander.

Williamston was the focus of activity in the civil rights movement.  Beginning in June 1963, civil rights activists protested at City Hall for 29 consecutive days led by Golden Frinks.

The Ku Klux Klan was very active in this part of the state during this time, including a well-documented rally in Williamston on October 5, 1963, attended by mostly local residents but with several carloads of attendees traveling over 150 miles to attend.

Geography
Williamston is on the Roanoke River.

Some major highways are US 13, US 17 and US 64.

Climate

Demographics

2020 census

As of the 2020 United States census, there were 5,248 people, 2,274 households, and 1,388 families residing in the town.

2000 census
As of the census of 2000, there were 5,844 people, 2,350 households, and 1,536 families residing in the town. The population density was 1,581.3 people per square mile (609.7/km). There were 2,506 housing units at an average density of 678.2 per square mile (261.5/km). The racial makeup of the town was 57.50% African American, 40.41% White, 0.29% Native American, 0.46% Asian, 0.09% Pacific Islander, 0.50% from other races, and 0.75% from two or more races. Hispanic or Latino of any race were 1.49% of the population.

There were 2,350 households, out of which 31.3% had children under the age of 18 living with them, 35.4% were married couples living together, 26.5% had a female householder with no husband present, and 34.6% were non-families. 31.9% of all households were made up of individuals, and 16.1% had someone living alone who was 65 years of age or older. The average household size was 2.38 and the average family size was 3.00.

In the town, the population was spread out, with 26.8% under the age of 18, 7.7% from 18 to 24, 23.2% from 25 to 44, 21.7% from 45 to 64, and 20.7% who were 65 years of age or older. The median age was 39 years. For every 100 females, there were 72.7 males. For every 100 females age 18 and over, there were 65.7 males.

The median income for a household in the town was $22,925, and the median income for a family was $32,984. Males had a median income of $28,661 versus $20,337 for females. The per capita income for the town was $14,125. 29.0% of the population and 22.8% of families were below the poverty line. 40.5% of those under the age of 18 and 28.6% of those 65 and 
older were living below the poverty line.

Arts and culture
Williamston has long been a town centered around equine activity. Its logo showcases a horse and the town houses one of the largest agricultural centers in Eastern North Carolina - The Senator Bob Martin Agricultural Center. Many events including horse shoes, rodeos, tractor pulls, and monster truck shows take place in the Agricultural Center. Williamston also draws thousands of people to its annual "Carolina Country Stampede" each year in September which is a two-day festival showcasing local food, vendors, business owners and bands typically with a well known headlining band to end the Festival such as Emerson Drive in 2017.

Education
Riverside High School
Martin Community College

Infrastructure

Emergency services
The Williamston Fire Rescue EMS responds to approximately 2,500 fire, rescue, EMS or hazardous materials calls per year, and covers a  area.  It has 19 full-time members, and approximately 37 volunteers.

Notable people 
 Asa Biggs, U.S. congressman from North Carolina and United States federal judge
 Tillie Ehringhaus, First Lady of North Carolina
 William E. Ingram, Jr., former director of the Army National Guard
 Gaylord Perry, Major League Baseball pitcher and member of the Baseball Hall of Fame
 Jim Perry, Major League Baseball pitcher
 Sarah J. C. Whittlesey (1824–1896), author, poet, hymn writer

References

External links

 Official website of Williamston, NC

Towns in Martin County, North Carolina
Towns in North Carolina
County seats in North Carolina
Historic Albemarle Tour
Populated places established in 1779
1779 establishments in North Carolina